Steve Ivey (born February 28, Nashville, Tennessee, United States) is an American songwriter, record producer, musician, and audio engineer. He is owner of IMI (Ivey Music International) which distributes music in over 20 countries, and creator of IMI Webshops (an online digital music retail platform). In 2011, Ivey also diversified his companies and opened Simon Solar, which is a solar electric power company with one of the largest solar facilities in the US. It has several other solar sites in development currently in the southeast US.

Music that Ivey produced or wrote has been on the Billboard top sales charts for over 1000 weeks consecutively, selling over 10 million CD's and songs. The Ivey Music International record label was one of Billboards #1 Label of The Decade for 2000 to 2010 awarded for the largest number of product sells in a genre.
 
He has written, created, and produced music for a wide variety of music artists, music for film and television, comedy albums, and music for corporations.  His music collaborations include working with Duck Dynasty, Mountain Man, Aaron Neville, Dolly Parton, Vince Gill, Mark Wills and many others.

Biography
Ivey began his career with a bachelor's degree in Music Performance Mercer university and a master's degree in Marketing/Communications
and incorporated his company at age 21.  His first studio recording experiences were in Macon GA with Paul Hornsby from the Muscadine Studio and Capricorn Studio.

He married and relocated to Fort Worth, Texas to earn a master's degree and then moved to Nashville, TN to set up his business.  The company name is IMI, which is Ivey Music International, as IMI's music can be found in over 20 countries around the globe. The IMI Studio is located in Franklin, Tennessee at The Sound Kitchen studio complex.

Career
He has written hundreds of songs with over 350 of his songs commercially recorded and released.  Ivey plays multiple instruments and aside from producing and engineering he has been credited as playing the following instruments on various recordings (piano, electric guitar, acoustic guitar, mandolin, percussion, dobro, harmonica, keyboards, banjo, lap guitar, bass guitar, bazouki, lead and background vocals).

Awards
His music accomplishments and creation of a wide variety's of music styles have put him on many different Billboard charts: Holiday, Urban, Comedy, Heatseeker, Country, Bluegrass, Top Year End charts.  He has been awarded and nominated for two Emmy Awards, three Grammy, two Tele Awards, six Dove Awards, the Gracie Allen Award, a NAPPA Gold children's award, and been written about in the following periodicals (People Magazine, PowerSource, MusicRow Country Weekly, Ladies Home Journal, US Magazine, CMA Magazine). Ivey has been #1 on Billboard charts 17 times with a variety of products.  The musical styles he has produced and created music in are Pop, R&B, Country, Classical, Bluegrass, Black Gospel, Southern Gospel, Christian Pop/Rock, Children's, Folk, Celtic, Spanish, and Jazz.

Ivey began as a performing artist singing and playing over 1000 concerts around the world from US to Asia. The performances were under the names of Steve Ivey, Steve Ivey and The League and Stevens Lane.  Ivey also created Vine and Branch Booking Agency and The Artist Workshop of which he sold both of those businesses. Ivey began developing a music distribution business in 2000 which has grown currently to include over 20,000 global retail stores. In 2004 he also began building a proprietary digital distribution internet retail platform which is called IMI Webshops. This digital distribution platform has grown to include many successful digital retailers and products such as, The Weather Channel, Dollar General, MARS, Pedigree, Jewelry Television, Stetson, Scott Towels, and many more.

In addition to the recording and multiple music business IMI continues to operate, Ivey began Simon Solar LLC in 2011, and has created the largest solar power plant in the eastern United States. Simon Solar continues to develop and create new solar power opportunities and projects.

Ivey currently resides with his wife and two children in Brentwood, Tennessee.

References

External links
Company website

Year of birth missing (living people)
Living people
American audio engineers
American male songwriters
Record producers from Tennessee
Songwriters from Tennessee
Musicians from Nashville, Tennessee